Steve Vallos (born December 28, 1983) is a former American football center in the National Football League. He was most recently on the roster for the Tennessee Titans of the National Football League (NFL). He was drafted by the Seattle Seahawks in the seventh round of the 2007 NFL Draft. He was an all-American at Wake Forest.

Vallos has also played for the Cleveland Browns, Philadelphia Eagles, Jacksonville Jaguars, and Denver Broncos.

Early years
Vallos attended Boardman High School in Boardman, Ohio, where he played football. He was selected to participate in the Big 33 Football Classic in July 2002. He lettered all four years in track and field, and placed first in discus for Mahoning County as a senior. Vallos earned The Vindicator track all-star honors for all four years of high school.

College career
Vallos played college football for Wake Forest University. After redshirting the 2002 season, he started in every game in 2003 at offensive guard. He graded out at 86.1 for the season, and he earned The Sporting News third-team Freshman All-America honors.

As a fifth-year senior, Vallos helped lead the Demon Deacons to the 2006 ACC Championship, where they defeated Georgia Tech by a score of 9–6. He graded out at 90 percent for the season, the best final score of his career.  Vallos left Wake Forest as the school's all-time leader in career starts (48).

Awards and honors
 Sporting News Freshman All-ACC (2003)
 Third-team Sporting News Freshman All-American (2003)
 First-team Rivals.com All-ACC (2004)
 Honorable mention All-ACC (2005)
 First-team College Football News All-ACC (2006)
 First-team Atlantic Coast Sports Media Association All-ACC (2006)
 Second-team WFCC All-American (2006)
 First-team Sports Illustrated All-American (2006)
 First-team Sporting News All-American (2006)
 College Football News ACC Player of the Year 2006)

Professional career

Seattle Seahawks
Vallos was selected by the Seattle Seahawks in the seventh round (232nd overall) of the 2007 NFL Draft. He was released during final roster cuts on September 1, 2007. He spent the 2007 season on the team's practice squad. After Chris Spencer suffered a season-ending injury in December 2008, Vallos started at center in his place. He played in 16 games in 2008 with five starts. Vallos played in all 16 games in 2009 with three starts, but was waived during final roster cuts on September 5, 2010.

Cleveland Browns
Vallos was claimed off waivers by the Cleveland Browns on September 7, 2010. He played in seven games in 2010 and one game in 2011.

Philadelphia Eagles
After his contract with the Browns expired following the 2011 season, Vallos signed a one-year contract with the Philadelphia Eagles on March 19, 2012.

He was released on August 31.

He was re-signed by the Philadelphia Eagles on September 18, 2012, to fill the spot vacated by center Jason Kelce, who was placed on season-ending injured reserve due to a knee injury.

Jacksonville Jaguars
Vallos was signed by the Jacksonville Jaguars on October 30, 2012, released on November 3, and signed again on November 5.

Denver Broncos
On July 28, 2013, Vallos was signed by the Denver Broncos to help replace Dan Koppen, who tore his ACL during practice earlier the same day.

Tennessee Titans
Vallos signed with the Tennessee Titans as a free agent on August 13, 2014 to add depth at center. The Titans waived him on August 31, prior to the start of the regular season.

References

External links
Denver Broncos bio
Philadelphia Eagles bio
Cleveland Browns bio
Seattle Seahawks bio
Wake Forest Demon Deacons bio

1983 births
Living people
Players of American football from Youngstown, Ohio
American football offensive tackles
American football offensive guards
American football centers
American people of Greek descent
Wake Forest Demon Deacons football players
Seattle Seahawks players
Cleveland Browns players
Philadelphia Eagles players
Jacksonville Jaguars players
Denver Broncos players
Tennessee Titans players